Gina Colarelli O'Connor is Professor of Innovation Management at Institut Universitaire de France, where she has worked since January 2019. She leads Babson's executive education programs in corporate innovation.

From 1988 to 2018, she was professor of marketing and innovation management in the Lally School of Management at Rensselaer Polytechnic Institute. There she served as the Associate Dean for Academic Affairs, Director of the Lally School's MBA/MS programs, Director of the Severino Center for Technology Entrepreneurship, and the Academic Director of the Executive MBA program.

At RPI, O’Connor was also the Director of the Radical Innovation Research Program, ongoing at the Lally School since 1995. In that role, she recently led a team of ten researchers across three universities in the program's second phase, a longitudinal research study designed to understand and improve large, established companies' implementation of radical innovation capabilities. She is responsible for recruiting twenty one Fortune 1000 companies to participate in this three-year effort, which is now complete and has culminated in the publication of a book, titled Grabbing Lightning: Building a Capability for Breakthrough Innovation (Jossey-Bass, 2008). The book was highlighted by Strategy + Business Magazine as the most influential book in Innovation in 2008.

Most recently, she led the next phase of the research, focusing on clarifying roles for innovation specialists. That effort culminated in the 2018 publication of the book Beyond the Champion: Institutionalizing Innovation Through People (Stanford University Press).
She has been recognized as one of the top 20 scholars in innovation management according to studies from 2007 and 2012. In 2014 she was recognized by the International Association for the Management of Technology (IAMOT) as one of the top scholars in Technology & Innovation Management and has been a speaker in the 2015 Innovation Roundtable 

Before joining RPI, O'Connor earned her Ph.D. in Marketing and Corporate Strategy at New York University. Prior to that time, she spent several years with McDonnell Douglas Corporation in Contract Administration on the AV-8B Harrier program, and at Monsanto Chemical Corporation's Department of Social Responsibility. She also holds an MBA and B.S. from Saint Louis University.

Professor O'Connor's teaching and research interests lie at the intersection of corporate entrepreneurship and Radical Innovation, Marketing, and Commercialization of Advanced Technologies. The majority of her research efforts focus on how firms create management systems to develop and sustain capabilities for Breakthrough Innovation and how innovators link advanced technology development to market opportunities.
She has published more than 90 articles in refereed journals including The Journal of Product Innovation Management, Organization Science, MIT's Sloan Management Review, California Management Review, Academy of Management Executive, and The Journal of Marketing among others, and is co-author of 3 books on Breakthrough Innovation in Large Mature companies e.g. ''Radical Innovation, How Mature Firms Can Outsmart Upstarts".

Professor O'Connor's teaching experience includes the executive MBA program at RPI and custom in house programs at a number of well known US based companies such as Air Products and Chemicals, Albany International, General Motors and IBM. In the full-time MBA program, she has participated in and led the flagship team taught courses in new product development, organizational growth, and business implications of emerging technologies. She has also developed courses such as Commercializing Advanced Technologies and Corporate Entrepreneurship that build on her work in Radical Innovation, and has developed and offered Doctoral Seminars in New Product Development and Qualitative Research Methods.
She won the RPI Alumni Teaching Award in 2006, and a number of her published papers have won best paper of the year award in various scholarly journals. O’Connor has consulted with many companies to help them develop capabilities for commercializing technology based on breakthrough innovations (BIs) and to develop management systems for evolving a BI capability.
She and her colleagues and students continue to research the phenomenon of managing BI, and translating the results into usable tools and frameworks for students and practitioners.

Books
 O'Connor - Beyond the Champion: Institutionalizing Innovation Through People

References

External links
 Homepage of Gina O'Connor
 Homepage of the Radical Innovation Group
 Innovation Roundtable
 

Rensselaer Polytechnic Institute faculty
Living people
Year of birth missing (living people)